Sihelné is a village and municipality in Námestovo District in the Žilina Region of northern Slovakia.

History
In historical records the village was first mentioned in 1630.

Geography
The municipality lies at an altitude of 710 metres and covers an area of 14.409 km². It has a population of about 2017 people.

External links
http://www.statistics.sk/mosmis/eng/run.html

Villages and municipalities in Námestovo District